Whale Adventure with Nigel Marven is four-part British nature documentary series presented by Nigel Marven and created by Image Impact for Channel 5 in association with Eden. It has premiered in March 2013 for four weeks. In the series, Nigel Marven follows the gray whales on their migration through North American Pacific coast, from Baja California in Mexico to Alaska.

Links 
 Whale Adventure with Nigel Marven on Channel 5 website

Documentary films about nature